This is a list of artists who are recording for or once recorded for Monstercat. This includes artists who have worked with Silk Music before its acquisition by Monstercat in 2021.



0–9
 7 Minutes Dead

A

B

C

D

E

F

G

H

I
Masayoshi Iimori
 Ill-esha
 Infected Mushroom
 Intercom
 Inverness

J
 Jay FM
 Jo.E
 Just a Gent

K

L

M

N

O
 Oblvyn
 Ocula
 OddKidOut
 Justin Oh
 Ookay
 Ovsky

P

Q
 Q'Aila
 Quiet Disorder

R

S

T

U
 Unlike Pluto
 Dr. Ushūu

V

W

X
 Xilent

Y
 Yako
 Adam Young
 Yula
 Anna Yvette

Z
 Manu Zain
 Zensei
 Zero Hero
 Terry Zhong
 Z:N
 Cozi Zuehlsdorff

References

 
Monstercat